Marcel Deslauriers (born in Montreal on July 22, 1905; died December 1988) was a Canadian/Québécois international draughts player. In 1956 he became the only North American, male or female, to win Draughts World Championship. A tournament in Canada was named in his honor and a book was written on him and his strategies.

Book on Deslauriers 
 L.J.A Koops, Marcel Deslauriers : Partijen, fragmenten en analyses

References 

Players of international draughts
Canadian draughts players
Sportspeople from Montreal
1905 births
1988 deaths